Luhan (born 1990) is a Chinese singer and actor.

Luhan may also refer to:

 Luhan (river) in Ukraine
 Mabel Dodge Luhan, née Ganson (1879–1962), American patron of the arts
 Petru Luhan (born 1977), Romanian politician

See also
 Mabel Dodge Luhan House, also known as Big House and St. Teresa House, Mabel Dodge Luhan's home in Taos, New Mexico, United States
 Lu Han (disambiguation)
 Luján (disambiguation)
 McLuhan, a surname